Hilary Angelo Gomes (born 13 July 1953) is a Trinidad and Tobago and West Indian former cricketer.

Cricket career
Gomes toured England with the West Indian youth team in 1970 and made his first-class debut as a left-handed batsman for Trinidad and Tobago against New Zealand in 1971-72. He played county cricket for Middlesex between 1973 and 1976. 

Gomes was a successful batsman for the West Indies, usually playing at number 3. He was part of the West Indies team which beat England 5-0 in 1984, the only time a touring side has won in England by such a margin. Gomes was named man of the match in both the First and Third Tests, in which he scored 143 and 104 respectively.

Gomes scored six centuries against Australia, most notably one on a bouncy Perth strip in 1984 that set up an innings victory. However, he is also remembered in Australia as the batsman whose wicket Dennis Lillee took during the Boxing Day Test in Melbourne in 1981 to break Lance Gibbs's world record for most Test wickets.

Coaching career
At the 1997 ICC Trophy in Malaysia, Gomes served as the head coach of the Canadian team.

Honours
Gomes was named Wisden Cricketer of the Year in 1985. The Larry Gomes Stadium in Malabar, Arima is named after him.

References

External links
 

1953 births
Living people
Middlesex cricketers
Trinidad and Tobago cricketers
East Trinidad cricketers
West Indies One Day International cricketers
West Indies Test cricketers
Wisden Cricketers of the Year
Cricketers at the 1983 Cricket World Cup
Trinidad and Tobago cricket coaches
Coaches of the Canada national cricket team
People from Arima